Ōtsuka is a Japanese surname.

Ōtsuka or Otsuka may also refer to:

Ōtsuka Station, the name of multiple railway stations in Japan
"Otsuka FC", former name of Japanese professional football team Tokushima Vortis
Otsuka Pharmaceutical Co., a Japan-based multi-national pharmaceutical company